White Snake is the first solo album by David Coverdale, released in May 1977. Coverdale would use the album title as the name of his future band, first known as "David Coverdale's Whitesnake" and soon afterwards shortened to Whitesnake.

Background and writing
As his first solo effort, Coverdale later admitted: "It's very difficult to think back and talk sensible about the first album. White Snake had been a very inward looking, reflective and low-key affair in many ways, written and recorded as it was in the aftermath of the collapse of Deep Purple."

Track listing
All songs written by David Coverdale, except where indicated.

Side one
"Lady" (Coverdale, Micky Moody) – 3:48
"Blindman" – 6:01
"Goldies Place" – 5:03
"Whitesnake" (Coverdale, Moody) – 4:22

Side two
"Time on My Side" (Coverdale, Moody) – 4:26
"Peace Lovin' Man" – 4:53
"Sunny Days" – 3:31
"Hole in the Sky" – 3:23
"Celebration" (Coverdale, Moody) – 4:11

Bonus tracks on the 2000 CD reissue
 "Peace Lovin' Man" (Take 1) – 5:04
 "Sunny Days" (Take 1) – 3:21

Personnel
David Coverdale – lead vocals, piano, percussion
Micky Moody – guitars, percussion, backing vocals
Tim Hinkley – organ, percussion, vocals
Ron Aspery – saxophone (baritone, tenor, alto, and soprano), flute
DeLisle Harper – bass, percussion, vocals
Roger Glover – bass, melodica, ARP 2600 synthesizer, percussion, vocals, production
Simon Phillips – drums, percussion
Liza Strike, Helen Chappelle, Barry St. John – backing vocals

Miscellaneous
Blindman was later re-recorded by Whitesnake in 1980, for their album Ready an' Willing.

Charts

References

 Liner notes from the Spitfire remastered edition of White Snake.

External links
 
 The Deep Purple Podcast - Episode #34 - David Coverdale - White Snake

1977 debut albums
David Coverdale albums
Albums produced by Roger Glover
Purple Records albums
Blues rock albums by British artists